Slunce, seno a pár facek (Sun, hay and a couple of smacks) is a Czech comedy film depicting life in one of the country's rural regions. It was released in 1989.

Cast
 Helena Růžičková as Mařena Škopková, Blažena's mother
 Stanislav Tříska as Vladimír Škopek, Blažena's father
 Valerie Kaplanová as grandmother Škopková
 Veronika Kánská as Blažena Škopková
 Bronislav Černý as plumber Venca Konopník
 Marie Pilátová as Vlasta Konopníková, Venca's mother
 Václav Troška as Konopník, Venca's father
 Petra Pyšová as waitress Miluna
 Luděk Kopřiva as parish priest Otík
 Vlastimila Vlková as priest's housekeeper Cecilka
 Jiří Lábus as inseminator Béďa
 Jiřina Jirásková as Václavka Hubičková
 Pavel Vondruška as secretary Mošna
 Miroslav Zounar as Chairman of the JZD Pepa Rádl
 Jaroslava Kretschmerová as secretary of the JZD, nickname Evík
 Marie Švecová as Mařenka Kelišová, nickname Keliška
 Jiří Růžička as fat Josef
 Josef Stárek as Karel Kroupa, doctor
 Kateřina Lojdová as Gabriela Tejfarová, M. Sc.

References

External links
 

1989 films
Czechoslovak comedy films
1989 comedy films
Czech sequel films
Czech comedy films
1980s Czech films
Films directed by Zdeněk Troška